Leonard R. Olijar is an American government official who has served as the Director of the Bureau of Engraving and Printing since 2015. As director, Olijar is responsible for managing the Bureau of Engraving and Printing, an agency within the United States Department of the Treasury tasked with producing Federal Reserve Notes, paper currencies, and United States Treasury securities.

Early life and education 
Born in September 1959, Olijar grew up in Lower Burrell, Pennsylvania. After graduating from Burrell High School, he earned a Bachelor of Science in Forestry from Pennsylvania State University in 1980, followed by a master's degree in accounting from the University of Colorado Denver in 1987.

Career 
Olijar began his career at the Bureau of Engraving and Printing in 1989 as a systems accountant. In 2006, he became chief financial officer of the Bureau of Engraving and Printing. In January 2013, Olijar became the Deputy Director of the Bureau of Engraving and Printing. Olijar was nominated to serve as Director by Barack Obama in 2015. As Director of the Bureau of Engraving and Printing, Olijar is responsible for the redesign of the $10, $20 and $50 bills, a process former U.S. Treasury Secretary Jack Lew described as "painfully slow", particularly as it relates to the replacement of Andrew Jackson by Harriet Tubman on the $20 bill, announced by Lew in 2016.

Personal life 
Olijar resides in Centreville, Virginia, with his wife, Suzanne. They have two daughters.

References 

1959 births
Living people
Obama administration personnel
Trump administration personnel
Pennsylvania State University alumni
University of Colorado Denver alumni
American accountants
People from Centreville, Virginia
People from Westmoreland County, Pennsylvania
United States Department of the Treasury officials